The 1891 South Australian Football Association season was the 15th season of the top-level Australian rules football competition in South Australia.

The 1891 SAFA season marked the height of interest in South Australian football attendance wise during the 19th century with average attendances not being surpassed until the following century.

Premiership Matches

Round 1

Round 2

Round 3

Round 4

Round 5

Round 6

Round 7

South Australia vs. Victoria

Round 8

Round 9

Round 10

Round 11

Ladder

References 

SANFL
South Australian National Football League seasons